Jason Michael Short (born July 16, 1978) is a retired American football linebacker in the National Football League. He played college football at Eastern Michigan University.

He was a member of the Philadelphia Eagles and Cleveland Browns.

External links 
Philadelphia Eagles biography

1978 births
Living people
American football linebackers
Barcelona Dragons players
Cleveland Browns players
Eastern Michigan Eagles football players
People from Painesville, Ohio
Philadelphia Eagles players